Čumovo is a village in Municipality of Prilep, North Macedonia.

Demographics
According to the 2002 census, the village had a total of 17 inhabitants. Ethnic groups in the village include:

Macedonians 17

References

Villages in Prilep Municipality